Riverbend Park is a  park in the Jupiter Farms section of Jupiter, in Palm Beach County, Florida. The area includes the Riverbend Regional Park Historic District with Indian middens and a preserved battlefield from the Seminole War at the Loxahatchee River Battlefield Park adjacent to Riverbend.  The park includes 10 miles of hiking/biking trails, 7 miles of equestrian trails and 5 miles of canoeing/kayaking trails and includes a section of the Loxahatchee River, a National Wild and Scenic River. A Florida cracker farmstead is displayed, as well as a Seminole-style chickee for picnics.

Cultural References
Riverbend Park is mentioned in the 2012 novel Torn by Leslie Ann Joy, who grew up in Jupiter Farms.

Gallery

See also
 Jonathan Dickinson State Park
Battle of the Loxahatchee

References

External links
 Riverbend Park - official site

Parks in Palm Beach County, Florida
Florida Native American Heritage Trail
Jupiter, Florida